The Pakistan Bar Council (PBC) was established by the Parliament in 1973 under the Legal Practitioners and Bar Councils Act.

It is the highest elected body of lawyers in Pakistan. It has twenty two members elected from across the country representing each province. The members of the Pakistan Bar Council are elected on the basis of a single transferable vote by the members of the Provincial Bar Councils (i.e., Punjab Bar Council, Sindh Bar Council, Khyber Pakhtunkhwa Bar Council, Balochistan Bar Council and Islamabad Bar Council).

Pakistan Bar Council is a regulating authority for lawyers in Pakistan and is one of the accredited councils by the Higher Education Commission of Pakistan.

Composition
The Pakistan Bar Council consists of Chairman Executive Committee, Vice Chairman and Members of Pakistan Bar Council elected by the Members of Provincial Bar Councils. Members serve a term of five years.

The Attorney General for Pakistan  acts as ex officio Chairman of Pakistan Bar Council. Role of Attorney General is only to act as returning officer of Pakistan Bar Council elections and to publish the gazette. Attorney General does not exercise power in matters relating to functions of the Bar Council.

Electoral Officers
 Chairman Executive: The Chairman of the executive committee is Chief Executive of Bar Council and is elected by the members of the Council in each year. Chairman Executive Committee has full authority to decide matters of Bar Council in every aspect.
 Vice Chairman: Vice Chairman is figurehead of Bar Council and is elected by the members of the Council in January each year. Vice Chairman is ex officio Member of each Committee of Bar Council. However, the executive powers of Bar Council rest with Chairman Executive Committee.
 Members of Pakistan Bar Council are elected after 4 years for a duration of 5 years by Elected Representatives of Lawyers of Pakistani Provincial Bar Councils.

Permanent Officer
 Secretary: A full-time employee of Grade 21, responsible to perform duties enshrined under the Legal Practitioners and Bar Councils Act, 1973. Subject to the provisions of the act and the rules,  the secretary shall act under the supervisory control of the Executive Committee of the Pakistan Bar Council.

Function
 Only those advocates recognized by the Bar Council may represent clients in all the branches of the Supreme Court of Pakistan. Pakistan Bar council is ..."responsible for safeguarding rights, interests and privileges of practicing lawyers, regulating their conduct and helping in the administration of justice".

List of Elected Leaders

References

External links

Pakistan Bar Council
Bar Councils in Pakistan
1973 establishments in Pakistan
Government agencies established in 1973
Professional associations based in Pakistan